Semenkovo is a rural locality (a village) in Mayskoye Rural Settlement, Vologodsky District, Vologda Oblast, Russia. The population was 1 as of 2002.

Geography 
The distance to Vologda is 6. Khrenovo is the nearest locality. there are 12 villages of Semenkovo in the region, to avoid misunderstandings, the village can be called the Museum of Architecture without Semenkovo

References 

Rural localities in Vologodsky District